The Albatros C.VIII N was a German large, single engine biplane bomber, intended for night time operations,  It was seriously underpowered and could only carry a small bomb load.

Design and development

The C.III N was a large but underpowered three bay night bomber, as denoted by the N, its engine only just powerful enough to meet the Idflieg two seat C-class minimum requirement.  It had straight edged, constant chord wings of about equal span and with parallel pairs of interplane struts.  There were ailerons on both upper and lower planes.

A  inline Mercedes D.III mounted in the nose with its upper cylinders exposed drove a two blade propeller, with two tandem, open cockpits aft. The externally braced tailplane was at mid-fuselage height; the fin, broad and almost quadrant-edged, carried a balanced rudder which ended above the elevators.  The C.VIII N landed on a fixed conventional undercarriage with a pair of mainwheels on a rigid axle and a tailskid.

The C.VIII N first flew in 1917 and it seems likely only one was built.

Specifications

References

C.VIII N
1910s German bomber aircraft
Aircraft first flown in 1917